The following lists events that happened during 1961 in Cape Verde.

Incumbents
Colonial governor: Silvino Silvério Marques

Events
Praia Airport opened as the nation's third airport
September 6: Hurricane Debbie passed through Cape Verde

Sports
Sporting Praia won the Cape Verdean Football Championship

References

 
1961 in the Portuguese Empire
Years of the 20th century in Cape Verde
1960s in Cape Verde
Cape Verde
Cape Verde